Espoir Basket Club (in English: Hope Basketball Club), also known as Espoir BC, is a Gabonese semi-professional basketball team based in Libreville.

They play in the Estuaire Province's Ligue de Basket-ball de l’Estuaire (Libabe), and won the province championship in 2022 after defeating former champions Clutch Time in the final, 73–37.

As runners-up of the 2022 Gabonese Cup and replacement of champions Clutch Time, Espoir earned the right to play in the 2023 BAL qualification. In September 2022, Espoir recruited Stéphane Lasme, widely considered the best Gabonese player ever, as a reinforcement.  Mickael Oganda is the team's current head coach.

Honours 
Ligue de Basket-ball de l’Estuaire

 Champions (1): 2022

Gabonese Cup

 Runners-up (1): 2022

In international competitions 
BAL Qualifiers

 2023 – In progress

Players

2022 roster 
The following is the Espoir roster for the 2023 BAL qualification:

References 

Basketball teams in Gabon
Libreville

Road to BAL teams